Fuerza Aérea (Edificio Cóndor) Heliport  is a public use heliport located near Buenos Aires, Buenos Aires Province, Argentina.

See also
List of airports in Argentina

References

External links 
 Airport record for Fuerza Aérea (Edificio Cóndor) Heliport at Landings.com

Buenos Aires Province
Heliports
Airports in Argentina